The CPBL most progressive award is the annual award officially given by Chinese Professional Baseball League. It is given to one player in the league. The award recognizes players who have "re-emerged" as a player during a single season.  First was given in 1993.

List of winners

See also
Baseball awards#Taiwan (Republic of China): Chinese Professional Baseball League (CPBL)
MLB Comeback Player of the Year Award
Comeback Player of the Year Award (disambiguation)

Chinese Professional Baseball League lists
Chinese Professional Baseball League awards